Marta Florença Casimiro dos Santos (born 25 December 1988, Luanda) is an Angolan handball player. She plays for the club Petro de Luanda and on the Angolan national team. She competed for the Angolan team at the 2012 Summer Olympics in London. and she is the side chick of cunamata

References

External links
 

Angolan female handball players
1988 births
Living people
Handball players at the 2012 Summer Olympics
Olympic handball players of Angola
African Games gold medalists for Angola
African Games medalists in handball

People from Luanda
Competitors at the 2015 African Games